Vandre East Assembly constituency is one of the 288 Vidhan Sabha constituencies of Maharashtra state in western India.

Overview
Vandre East constituency is one of the 26 Vidhan Sabha constituencies located in the Mumbai Suburban district.

Vandre East is part of the Mumbai North Central Lok Sabha constituency along with five other Vidhan Sabha segments, namely Vile Parle, Chandivali, Kurla, Kalina and Vandre West in the Mumbai Suburban district.

Members of Legislative Assembly

^ By-poll

Election results

Assembly elections 2019

2015 Bypoll

Assembly elections, 2014

Assembly elections 2009

See also
 Bandra
 List of constituencies of Maharashtra Vidhan Sabha

References

Assembly constituencies of Mumbai
Politics of Mumbai Suburban district
Assembly constituencies of Maharashtra